Pir Kuh may refer to:
 Pir Kuh-e Olya
 Pir Kuh-e Sofla
 Pir Kuh Rural District